Gary Arnold Flandro (born March 30, 1934 in Salt Lake City, Utah) is an American aerospace engineer who is currently the professor for the Boling Chair of Excellence in Space Propulsion (Emeritus) at the University of Tennessee Space Institute.  He is also the Vice President and Chief Engineer for Gloyer-Taylor Laboratories (GTL).

Life and work
Flandro earned his B.S. in Mechanical Engineering from the University of Utah in 1957, his Master’s in Aeronautics from the California Institute of Technology in 1960 and his Ph.D. from Caltech in 1967 as supervised by Frank E. Marble. He has worked at UTSI and possessed the Boling Chair of Excellence in Space Propulsion since 1991. Flandro has authored or co-authored 95 conference papers, including traveling to Kyoto, Japan during 2006 to present a paper titled “Understanding Oscillatory Behavior of Liquid Propellant Rockets and Jet Engine Thrust Augmentors," at the Seventh International Symposium on Special Topics in Chemical Propulsion. He has also authored or co-authored 54 refereed papers, four books and two book chapters. He was named a Fellow of the American Institute of Aeronautics and Astronautics on May 13, 2008.

Flandro is an 11th generation pupil of Euler. The lineage is: Euler, Lagrange, Fourier, Lejeune Dirichlet, Lipschitz, Klein, Lindemann, Hilb, Bar, Liepmann, Marble, Flandro.

Flandro’s work has assisted decades of space flight and several missions to the outer planets. His research work with combustion instability of solid rocket motors has “practically solved a challenging issue that had plagued the field for many years,” said Vigor Yang Head, School of Aerospace Engineering Georgia Institute of Technology. Flandro has coauthored several textbooks including:  "Basic Aerodynamics: Incompressible Flow" with Howard McMahon and Robert L. Roach of Georgia Tech, and "Combustion Instability in Solid Propellant Rockets" with Edward W. Price of Georgia Tech. It is in regular use in Flandro's short courses at UTSI.

Gas giants
During the summer of 1964 at the NASA Jet Propulsion Laboratory (JPL), Flandro was assigned the task of studying techniques for exploring the outer planets of the solar system.  His study discovered a rare near-future alignment of the outer planets (Jupiter, Saturn, Uranus, and Neptune) and conceived a multi-planet mission (later named the Planetary Grand Tour) utilizing the gravity-assist technique to reduce the mission duration from forty years to less than ten years. This work was exploited by NASA with the Voyager 1 and Voyager 2 missions, launched in 1977.

Flandro was recognized for this work first by the British Interplanetary Society (1970 M. N. Golovine Award), and later by NASA (1998 Exceptional Achievement Medal, with the citation: "for seminal contributions to the design and engineering of multi-outer-planet missions, including the Grand Tour opportunity for the epic Voyager explorations").

The ideas from this research have had a major affect on subsequent solar system exploration; the missions Galileo (Jupiter satellite tour) and the Cassini (Saturn satellite tour) were made possible by the gravity assist method. Flandro (also in 1965) studied gravity assist trajectories to Pluto; these are the basis for the mission New Horizons launched in January 2006, which arrived at Pluto in 2015.

References

External links
 Gary Flandro's website

21st-century American engineers
University of Utah alumni
University of Tennessee faculty
1934 births
Living people
People from Salt Lake City
California Institute of Technology alumni